Edward Maurice Charles Marsan (born 9 June 1968) is an English actor. He won the London Film Critics Circle Award and the National Society of Film Critics Award for Best Supporting Actor for the film Happy-Go-Lucky (2008).

He has featured in films such as Gangster No. 1 (2000), Ultimate Force (2002), V for Vendetta (2006), Mission: Impossible III (2006), Sixty Six (2006), Hancock (2008), Sherlock Holmes (2009), War Horse (2011), Sherlock Holmes: A Game of Shadows (2011), The Best of Men (2012), The World's End (2013), Still Life (2013), and The Exception (2016). His major TV credits include his role as Terry in Showtime's Ray Donovan (2013–2020) and as Mr Norrell in the BBC drama Jonathan Strange & Mr Norrell (2015).

Early life
Marsan was born on 9 June 1968 in the Stepney district of London, to a working-class family; his father was a lorry driver and his mother was a school dinner lady and teacher's assistant. He was brought up in Bethnal Green and attended Raine's Foundation School. He left school at 16 and initially served an apprenticeship as a printer, before beginning his career in theatre. He trained at the Mountview Academy of Theatre Arts, graduating in 1991, and went on to study under Sam Kogan and the Kogan Academy of Dramatic Arts, now known as The School of the Science of Acting, of which Marsan is now a patron.

Career
Marsan's first television appearance was in 1992, as a "yob", in the London Weekend Television series The Piglet Files. One of his more significant early television appearances was in the popular mid-1990s BBC sitcom Game On as an escaped convict who was an old flame of Mandy's. Marsan went on to have roles in Casualty, The Bill, Grass, Kavanagh QC, Grange Hill, Silent Witness, Ultimate Force, Southcliffe, and more. He also voiced the Manticore in the Merlin episode "Love in the Time of Dragons".

In 2012, He portrayed Terry Donovan, brother to the lead character in 7 series and 82 episodes of Showtime's drama series Ray Donovan. The same year he played Ludwig Guttmann in the television film The Best of Men. In May 2015, Marsan appeared as the practical magician Gilbert Norrell in the BBC period drama Jonathan Strange & Mr Norrell.

Marsan has appeared in numerous and varied film roles, as the main villain in the 2008 superhero film Hancock alongside Will Smith and as Inspector Lestrade in Guy Ritchie's Sherlock Holmes. His other films include Sixty Six, Gangs of New York, 21 Grams, The Illusionist, V for Vendetta, Gangster No. 1, Miami Vice, Mission: Impossible III, I Want Candy, Vera Drake, Happy-Go-Lucky, Filth, Tyrannosaur and Heartless.

In 2021 Marsan appeared as anti-Fascist activist Soly Malinovsky in the television adaptation of the novel Ridley Road. In 2022 Marsan played the real-life role of John Darwin, in The Thief, His Wife and the Canoe.

In January 2023, it was announced that Marsan was added to the cast of the Amy Winehouse biopic Back to Black and would be playing Winehouse's father Mitch Winehouse.

Personal life
Marsan married make-up artist Janine Schneider in 2002. They have four children. Marsan is a humanist and was appointed a patron of Humanists UK in 2015.

Filmography

Film

Television

Video games

Awards and nominations

References

External links

1968 births
Alumni of the Mountview Academy of Theatre Arts
English atheists
English humanists
English male film actors
English male television actors
Living people
People educated at Raine's Foundation School
People from Bethnal Green
People from Stepney